A sash is a large and usually colorful ribbon or band of material worn around the body.

Sash may also refer to:

 Fascia, a sash worn by clerics and seminarians with the cassock in the Roman Catholic Church and in the Anglican Church
 Sash Lilac, one of the three protagonists from the Freedom Planet video game series
 Sash window, the framing that holds panes of glass in a glazed window
 Stand-alone shell, a Unix shell designed for use in recovering from certain types of system failures
 Sash, Texas, a small community in Fannin County
The Sash, a ballad from Ireland commemorating the victory of King William III in the Williamite war in Ireland in 1690–1691

Acronyms 
 Spring Axis Struts and Hibernate (SASH), a combination (stack) of open-source Java components identified by their initials: Spring Framework, Apache Axis, Apache Struts, and Hibernate

People 
 Sash! (born 1970), German DJ/producer team
 Cecily Sash (1924–2019), South African painter, professor
 Leon Sash (1922–1979), American jazz accordionist
 Tyler Sash (1988–2015), American football defensive back